The heats for the men's 200 metre butterfly race at the 2009 World Championships took place in the morning of 28 July, with the final in the evening session of 29 July at the Foro Italico in Rome, Italy.

Records
Prior to this competition, the existing world and competition records were as follows:

The following records were established during the competition:

Results

Heats

Semifinals

Final

See also
Swimming at the 2007 World Aquatics Championships – Men's 200 metre butterfly
Swimming at the 2008 Summer Olympics – Men's 200 metre butterfly

References
Worlds 2009 results: Men's 200m Fly Heats, from OmegaTiming.com (official timer of the 2009 Worlds); retrieved 2009-07-29.
Worlds 2009 results: Men's 200m Fly Semifinals, from OmegaTiming.com (official timer of the 2009 Worlds); retrieved 2009-07-29. 
Worlds 2009 results: Men's 200m Fly Finals, from OmegaTiming.com (official timer of the 2009 Worlds); retrieved 2009-07-29.

Butterfly Men 200